Joseph L. Galiber (October 26, 1924 – November 21, 1995) was an American politician from New York.

Life
He was born on October 26, 1924, the son of Joseph F. Galiber and Ethel (Bowser) Galiber (1901–1997). During World War II he served in the U.S. Army as a staff sergeant, and took part in the Red Ball Express.

He played on the 1949–50 CCNY Beavers men's basketball team which won the 1950 NCAA Men's Division I Basketball Tournament and the 1950 National Invitation Tournament. He married Emma (died 1995), and they had two daughters. They lived in the Bronx.

Galiber was a member of the New York State Senate from 1969 until his death in 1995, sitting in the 178th, 179th, 180th, 181st, 182nd, 183rd, 184th, 185th, 186th, 187th, 188th, 189th, 190th and 191st New York State Legislatures. In 1973, he sought the Democratic nomination for New York City Comptroller, but was defeated in the primary by Harrison J. Goldin. On January 8, 1974, Galiber was chosen as Third Deputy Mayor of New York City. Because of questions arising from the financing of Galiber's campaign for City Comptroller, Mayor Abraham Beame postponed Galiber's appointment on January 10. On January 16, Beame withdrew the appointment of Galiber, and appointed Paul Gibson Jr. to the post instead. In 1979, Galiber sought the Democratic nomination for Borough President of the Bronx, but was defeated in the primary by the incumbent Stanley Simon. Galiber then ran in the general election on the New Alliance Party ticket, but was defeated again by Simon.  Galiber was an alternate delegate to the 1984 and 1988 Democratic National Conventions.

He died on November 21, 1995, in Columbia-Presbyterian Medical Center in Manhattan.

References

1924 births
1995 deaths
Democratic Party New York (state) state senators
CCNY Beavers men's basketball players
American athlete-politicians
20th-century American politicians
American men's basketball players
Basketball players from New York City
Politicians from the Bronx
United States Army personnel of World War II